Caldwell is an unincorporated community in northern Mecklenburg County, North Carolina, United States.

Geography
Caldwell is located at  (35.453749, -80.842851), south of the town of Davidson on State Highway 115. It lies 850 feet (259 m) above sea level.

References

Unincorporated communities in North Carolina
Unincorporated communities in Mecklenburg County, North Carolina